The Baltimore Canaries were a professional baseball team that existed for three seasons in the National Association, from 1872 to 1874.

List of players
Players in Bold and have the symbol †, are members of the National Baseball Hall of Fame.



A

B
Bill Barrett
Oscar Bielaski
Frederick Boardman
Asa Brainard
Robert Brown

C
Tom Carey
John Carl
Bill Craver
Candy Cummings†

D
Harry Deane

E

F
Cherokee Fisher
Davy Force

G
Joe Gerhardt
Charlie Gould

H
George Hall
Scott Hastings
Dick Higham

I

J
Levin Jones

K
Henry Kohler

L

M
Jack Manning
Bobby Mathews
Cal McVey
Everett Mills

N

O

P
Lip Pike

Q

R
John Radcliffe
Hugh Reid
Henry Reville
Johnny Ryan

S
Lou Say
Frank Selman
Bill Smiley
John Smith
Pop Snyder
Charlie Sweasy

T
Zachary Taylor

U

V

W
Warren White
Wood

X

Y
Tom York

Z

References

External links
Franchise index at Baseball-Reference and Retrosheet

Baltimore Canaries

Major League Baseball all-time rosters